Calvenzano (Bergamasque:  or ) is a comune (municipality) in the Province of Bergamo in the Italian region of Lombardy, located about  east of Milan and about  south of Bergamo.

Calvenzano borders the following municipalities: Arzago d'Adda, Caravaggio, Casirate d'Adda, Misano di Gera d'Adda, Treviglio, Vailate.

Demographic evolution

References